('Rhymes and Tales') is the national book of Western Frisian literature, written by the three Brothers Halbertsma. Eventually their works were gathered together, and the first edition of the actual  was published posthumously in 1871. Although the literary value of this collection was later disputed by some critics,  and its predecessor  played a role of crucial importance in the development of a new literary tradition after Western Frisian had been used almost exclusively as a spoken language for three centuries.

The authors
The two most important of the brothers were Justus Hiddes Halbertsma (1789–1869), a Mennonite minister in Bolsward en from 1822 onwards in Deventer, and Eeltsje Hiddes Halbertsma (1797–1858), who was a physician in Grou. Justus was a man of science, a prominent linguist, who was acquainted with German literary figures such as the Brothers Grimm. He strongly sensed what the public needed, but at the same time he was a somewhat distant and cerebral author, which tended to have an averse effect on his poetry. His brother Eeltsje, whose prose and poetry were of equal quality, was probably the most talented of the brothers. He was also a much more emotional person, who was sometimes overcome by periods of melancholy, which found an outlet in his writings. The third brother, Tsjalling Hiddes Halbertsma (1792–1852), who was a butter and cheese merchant in Grou, was greatly overshadowed by his brothers as a literary writer. His oeuvre mainly consisted of folk literature, which, however, became quite popular with the common man.

Origins
According to Justus, Eeltsje then set out to write poetry with the intent of replacing the existing songs with better ones of his own making. According to Breuker, it seems more likely that Eeltsje wanted to emulate these Dutch street songs.

In any case, Justus as well as Eeltsje started writing poetry and short fiction, and as Justus remained the editor of Eeltsje's works for his entire life, their oeuvres were strongly connected and published together from the very beginning. This publication was attributed to the fictional 'Gabe Skroar', a lame farmer's son who became a tailor and a writer, but died young. This character was in all probability a creation of Eeltsje's. Hiding behind such a fictional author was fairly normal at that time, but Breuker suggests that an extra reason may have been that the Halbertsmas felt it was a little silly to put two names on such a limited collection.

The character of Gabe Skroar (or 'Gabe Tailor') was somewhat ambiguous from the very beginning, which was caused by the difference in the styles of writing used by Justus and Eeltsje. Where Eeltsje's Gabe remained a simple farmer's son who liked to potter about with his writings in the wasted hours, Justus' Gabe was implicitly a more lettered man, who clearly had literary ambitions. Furthermore, Gabe Skroar's role changed in the course of time: in 1822, he was presented only as the writer of the collection, but in the publications of 1829 and 1834, he developed into the main character of the stories. In the long run, the character of Gabe became unusable, which was mostly due to Justus' constant little adjustments, and in 1839 even Eeltsje had to admit that there was no point anymore to publishing their works under Gabe Skroar's name.

Development
Those were not sold, however, but at the expense of Justus Halbertsma presented to acquaintances of his all over Friesland. In this way he awoke among his public a desire for more reading-matter of this nature. Later he would write about this: "That first blow was half the battle. The fans who did not receive a copy were squealing like bleeding pigs, and the way was cleared for all the stories and poems which followed." Copies of the booklet were often shared around through entire networks of family and friends, and frequently its stories and poems were transcribed by hand before the booklet was given back or passed on. After that, additions were published separately in 1836, 1840, 1854, and 1858 ( and ). 

This was done in thirteen installments (the first of which was published in October 1868), which meant it took more than two years before the buyers, who had to subscribe to the entire series of installments, possessed the book in its complete form. The decision to publish  was made in 1863, and the first two installments were edited by Justus Hiddes Halbertsma himself. He even wrote some new pieces for the collection, such as the short story  ('The Thick Suit'). The rest of the installments were, however, composed under the supervision of librarian and archivist Gerben Colmjon and bookseller and historian Wopke Eekhoff, with Eekhoff giving permission to add the works by Eeltsje Halbertsma which had originally been published by him, not De Lange.

This time, the sole editor was Gerben Colmjon, who, in general, did not make many changes to the first edition, although he did introduce "a certain unity in the spelling of vowels and consonants." It is possible that in 1887 there was a reprint issued of the 1881 edition, although Breuker considers it likely that the scant sources for this were actually referring to a remnant of the 1881 printing. In any case, nothing was changed in the text of the book. In 1891 G. M. Merkelbach from Bolsward resolved to publish a new edition, but nothing came of it, and neither did the linguist  succeed in publishing the new edition he contemplated in 1892. It was edited by W. P. de Vries, who changed the text to the so-called  ('Society Spelling'), which had been introduced for the Western Frisian language in 1879. However, because he retained the layout from the 1881 edition, this caused a rather restless page image, as he kept exactly the same words on a given line, while the number of letters within the words was changed quite dramatically in some cases.

After he had sold the last of the 1895 books in 1916, he began to prepare for a new edition, which would see the light in 1918. Wiersma, as a matter of fact, was paid for his drawings by the Halbertsma family, instead of by Van der Velde. Minister Geart Aeilco Wumkes was asked to write an introduction, for which he could draw on the extensive correspondence between the Halbertsma Brothers which the family made available for his use. This meant that after 37 years the Dutch-language introduction Eekhoff had added to the 1881 edition was finally discarded. The composition of  itself was also changed, especially by adjusting the sequence in which the stories and poems were placed, and also by the addition of several of the Brothers Halbertsma's works which had remained outside of the collection up until then. This was primarily done on the insistence of Wumkes, who was an admirer of Tsjalling Halbertsma.

This edition was printed by Miedema & Co. in Leeuwarden, and had a large printing (for the standards of Western Frisian literature) of 2,500 copies, which was however outsubscribed three times and therefore sold out immediately. The editor this time was the author J. P. Wiersma, who added a new introduction of his own making, in which he offered a romanticised biography of the Brothers Halbertsma.

When in 1958 the sixth edition was published, Wiersma was again the editor. At that time, he replaced his earlier introduction with a new one, which was clearer and more matter-of-fact and to the point, but he also made further changes to the Halbertsma's text and choice of words, which he had smoothed and simplified somewhat already for the 1944 edition. This intervention (or interference) of Wiersma's led to a large amount of criticism, although there is a case to be made that these changes were actually beneficial to the uninitiated reader. The publishers of the 1958 edition were Van der Velde and A. J. Osinga Publishers of Bolsward. Afterwards two facsimile editions were published in 1969 and 1978, which were direct photocopies of the 1958 edition (in 1969), and the 1969 edition (in 1978) respectively. Especially Ids Wiersma's illustrations were not improved by making a copy of a copy.

For the composition of this edition editor Philippus H. Breuker reached back to the original edition of 1871, while retaining later additions, like Ids Wiersma's illustrations and the stories and poems which had been absorbed into the collection in 1918. As for the spelling, Breuker remained as close as possible to the 1871 edition as long as that did not make the text entirely incomprehensible to modern readers. The 1993 edition had an ambitious printing (for Western Frisian literature) of 3,000 copies, but was sold out within two months.

Reception
The so-called  ('Big Rag Basket'; that is to say, the 1834 edition) needed twenty years to sell out, to Justus Halbertsma's disappointment. In the letters he wrote later in life, Justus indicates, however, that he would do it all over again, as he and Eeltsje had set themselves the goal of making the Frisian people start to read in their own language again, and by 1850 they had succeeded handsomely. By that time they had won a large number of loyal fans, as they would be called today, consisting mostly of people of standing, such as ministers, physicians, public notaries, gentleman farmers, etc., and also of the peasantry. Furthermore, there must also have been interested persons from outside of Friesland, and from among the urban middle class, as Gerben Colmjon mentioned in 1881 that  was often read, by that time, by people who did not speak Frisian in daily life.

By the end of the 19th century,  was held in high regard in Western Frisian literary circles, being the book which had rescued the Western Frisian language from literary oblivion. In the oeuvre of poets like Obe Postma and Pieter Jelles Troelstra, who grew up in that period,  reverberates quite clearly. Even in 1918, Geart Aeilco Wumkes wrote, "this book remains a monument for a section of the life of a nation, which calls on the Frisian soul to love its own nature and being."

This was inevitable, really, since  was the seminal book of the generation against which the Young Frisians were reacting. Douwe Kalma, the pre-eminent representative of the new order, maintained that "on the development of the Frisian spiritual life [this book] can not have other than an unsuitable and unfavourable influence." Kalma measured (in concurrence with the notions of his time) the literary value of a book by the degree of life tragedy which it included, and concluded that  were no more than "vulgar children's amusement" and a "cruel mockery" of said life tragedy. He even went so far as to say that the works of the Brothers Halbertsma had "spiritually murdered thousands of people." Another Young Frisian, Eeltsje Boates Folkertsma, missed in  not so much life tragedy as the mysticism which he felt was an indispensable element of true literature.

In the middle of the 20th century, when the Young Frisian fire had died down somewhat, the pendulum swung back in the other direction. Wadman wrote that the Halbertsmas gave "the Western Frisian people a literary monument, in which it saw its own life as a nation [...] reflected." As neither Willem Bilderdijk nor Isaäc da Costa were fit to hold a candle to Eeltsje Halbertsma (Wadman also wrote), one would look in vain for someone of the same stature in the Dutch literature of the same period. The linguist Philippus H. Breuker, writing in 1993, for the most part subscribed to the same view, and elucidated that it was the wistfulness for what was and the surprise for what is which makes Eeltsje Halbertsma's poetry in particular so special. Justus Halbertsma's works, on the other hand, are more abstract, revolve more around ideas and not so much around emotions, and therefore they have a more sharp-edged feel.

As of today the Brothers Halbertsma's  still occupies the first slot in the ranking of Western Frisian literary classics. It is commonly seen as "the classical work of Western Frisian literature. It is read by high and low, by learned and unlearned, maybe even still by Frisian and un-Frisian."

References

Sources
 , Oer Skriuwers, Boek en Utjeften, in: , Rimen en Teltsjes, Drachten (A.J. Osinga Uitgeverij), 1993, pp. 587–613.
 , Rimen en Teltsjes; Halbertsma, Eeltsje; Halbertsma, Justus (Joost Hiddes); Halbertsma, Tsjalling Hiddes in: , Nieuwe Encyclopedie van Fryslân, Gorredijk/Leeuwarden (Utjouwerij Bornmeer/Tresoar), 2016, pp. 1123–1124, 1126–1128, 2251.
 , Lyts Hânboek fan de Fryske Literatuer, Leeuwarden (Afûk), 1997, .
 ――, Fryslân Sjongt, Leeuwarden (Afûk), 2000, .
 , Rimen en Teltsjes, Bolsward/Leeuwarden (A.J. Osinga Uitgeverij/R. van der Velde), 1958, no ISBN.
 , Rimen en Teltsjes, Drachten (A.J. Osinga Uitgeverij), 1993, .
 , Fryslân: Fêstens en Feroaring, in: , De Fryslannen, Leeuwarden (Frisian Council/Afûk), 2008, .
 , Cultuur in Friesland en Friese Cultuur, 1795–1917, in: , Geschiedenis van Friesland 1750–1995, Amsterdam/Leeuwarden (Uitgeverij Boom/Fryske Akademy), 1998, pp. 172–212.
 , Spiegel van de Friese Poëzie: Van de Zeventiende Eeuw tot Heden, Amsterdam (J.M. Meulenhoff B.V.), 1994, .
 , Nieuwe Encyclopedie van Fryslân, Gorredijk/Leeuwarden (Utjouwerij Bornmeer/Tresoar), 2016, .
 , Tweeduizend Jaar Geschiedenis van Friesland, Leeuwarden (Uitgeverij M.Th. van Seyen), no year, no ISBN, pp. 312–323.
 , Fan Fryslâns Forline, Bolsward (A.J. Osinga N.V.), 1968, no ISBN, pp. 296–299.
 , Frieslands Dichters, Leiden (L. Stafleu), 1949, no ISBN.
 , Foarwurd and De Bruorren Halbertsma, in: , Rimen en Teltsjes, Bolsward (A.J. Osinga N.V.), 1958, pp. 5–14.
 , Bodders yn de Fryske Striid, Bolsward (A.J. Osinga N.V.), 1926, no ISBN.

External links
 

1871 poems
1871 short story collections
Dutch poetry collections
West Frisian literature